The Robert Shaw Chorale was a renowned professional choir founded in New York City in 1948 by Robert Shaw, a Californian who had been drafted out of college a decade earlier by Fred Waring to conduct his glee club in radio broadcasts.

History 

The Chorale enjoyed an intermittent existence, being formed and re-formed on an ad hoc basis for national and international tours and several RCA Victor recordings, its personnel count ranging from around thirty to around sixty voices depending on repertoire requirements. The Chorale ceased operations permanently in 1965, shortly before Shaw assumed the post of Music Director of the Atlanta Symphony Orchestra. During its existence the Robert Shaw Chorale became arguably the best-known and most widely respected professional choral organization in the United States, with repertoire ranging from J.S. Bach to folk music and Broadway theatre tunes.   The group's album recording "Christmas Hymns And Carols" released in November 1957 was certified gold in August 1964 by the Recording Industry Association of America (RIAA).   This recording peaked at #5 on Billboard's Top Pop Album Chart.  The group made several tours sponsored by the U.S. State Department as part of a cultural exchange program, including 21 European and Mid-eastern countries in 1956; South America; and in 1962, a seven-week tour of Russia.

The Robert Shaw Chorale was notable for its homogeneity of tone, finely wrought balances between vocal sections, elegance of phrasing, and rhythmic vitality. Many of its members were recruited from Juilliard and other NYC-area conservatories, sometimes to the consternation of those singers’ voice teachers: Shaw was fond in later years of relating that when he was preparing to take the Chorale on a grueling U.S. tour of 36 one-night stands performing Bach’s lengthy Mass in B Minor, several teachers protested that he would ruin their students’ voices. At the end of the tour, when teachers remarked with astonishment that the voices had actually improved, Shaw replied to the effect that “Bach has been teaching singing.” Alumni of the Chorale include a number of singers who had significant careers as solo artists, including sopranos Yvonne Ciannella and Shirlee Emmons, alto Florence Kopleff, tenors Seth McCoy and Jon Humphrey, and baritone Thomas Pyle; and several others who have worked with distinction as directors of their own choruses, such as Clayton Krehbiel, Donald Craig, and Maurice Casey.

The Robert Shaw Chorale ceased operations with Robert Shaw's move to Atlanta. Subsequent groups with which Shaw gave concerts and made recordings, apart from the Atlanta Symphony Orchestra and Chorus, were the Robert Shaw Festival Singers, a group which operated mainly around Shaw's summer home in France after his retirement as the Atlanta Symphony Orchestra's Music Director; and the Robert Shaw Chamber Singers, an Atlanta-based group composed chiefly of members of the Atlanta Symphony Chamber Chorus.

Sources

This article is based on interviews with Florence Kopleff, who was a member of the Robert Shaw Chorale throughout its existence and served as administrative assistant to Mr. Shaw; and on recollections of John W. Cooledge, a member of the Atlanta Symphony Orchestra Chorus and Chamber Chorus, and of the Robert Shaw Chamber Singers throughout the existence of that group.

The Billboard Book of Gold & Platinum Records first published 1990.

Selected recordings
Mascagni: Cavalleria Rusticana, RCA Victor, 1953
Leoncavallo: Pagliacci, RCA Victor, 1953
My True Love Sings, RCA Victor, 1956
Sea Shanties, RCA Victor, 1961
Bach: Mass in B minor, RCA Victor, Grammy winner, 1962
 This Is My Country RCA Victor, 1963
The Many Moods of Christmas, RCA Victor, 1963.
Handel: Messiah, RCA Victor, Grammy winner, recorded 1966

Complete catalogue at Discogs.

References

External links
 Robert Lawson Shaw Site.

Choirs in New York City
American choirs
Musical groups established in 1948
Musical groups disestablished in 1965